Taworta, or Diebroud (also Dabra, Bok, Taria), is a Lakes Plain language of Irian Jaya, Indonesia.

Further reading
Rumaropen, Benny. 2006. Survey Report on the Diebrou Language of Papua, Indonesia. Unpublished ms. Jayapura: SIL Indonesia.

References

East Lakes Plain languages
Languages of western New Guinea